Donyo is a given name and nickname. Notable people with this name include the following:

Donyo Donev (1929 – 2007), Bulgarian animator, director, art director, comics artist and cartoonist
Donyo Dorje (1463 – 1512), Tibetan prince
Donyo Kuzmanov, nickname for Anton Kuzmanov (born 1918), Bulgarian footballer
Jamyang Donyo Gyaltsen (1310 - 1344), Tibetan ruler

See also

Dondo (disambiguation)
Dongo (disambiguation)
Donya (disambiguation)